Bard Gap or Bard-e Gap may refer to:
 Bard-e Gap, Izeh, Khuzestan Province
 Bard Gep, Khuzestan Province